Ursa Major is the fourth studio album by American rock band Third Eye Blind. Released on August 18, 2009 on the group's own Mega Collider label, Ursa Major was the group's first studio album in over six years. The first single from the album was "Don't Believe a Word", which debuted on the radio June 5, 2009.

Background 
Frontman Stephan Jenkins had intended for the album to be released in 2007 but didn't feel that it was complete, and writer's block slowed down the album's progress. In an interview with Rolling Stone Jenkins also noted that the recording industry had "just collapsed" following the release of Out of the Vein.

The working title of the album was The Hideous Strength, after a similarly named C.S. Lewis book.  According to Jenkins, the album's name was subsequently changed to Ursa Major because "...We’ve been hibernating and now we’ve awakened and we are hungry for spring and we want to feed and we want to thrive." Another album, Ursa Minor (B-Sides compilation), was scheduled to follow Ursa Major, but the idea was later scrapped in favor of a new studio album.

Ursa Majors cover is derived from Uranographia, a 17th-century drawing by Johannes Hevelius. The view is mirrored following the tradition of celestial globes, showing the celestial sphere in a view from "outside", with the drawing mirrored to match the view through a telescope.

Release and promotion
The album was released on August 23, 2009. The first single, "Don't Believe a Word", was released June 5, 2009.

Reception

Upon its release, Ursa Major received positive reviews from music critics. The review aggregator website Metacritic assigns a "Metascore" to each album, which is based on the ratings and reviews of selected mainstream independent publications, and the release has a score of a 65 based on 7 selected critics, indicating "generally favorable reviews".

Commercial performance
Ursa Major debuted at #3 on the Billboard 200, selling 49,000 copies in its first week of release. The top 10 debut made Ursa Major the highest-charting album of the group's career, though its first week sales were less than that of its predecessor's first week sales of 63,000.Hasty, Katey. "Marilyn Manson Posts 'Grotesque' At No. 1". billboard.com. May 21, 2003. The sales would prove to be short lived, as Ursa Major fell to #45 in its second week on the Billboard 200 with a 77% sales drop.

Track listing

Vinyl versionNotes"Monotov's Private Opera" is not listed on the back of the LP version and is the final song on the LP.

PersonnelThird Eye BlindStephan Jenkins – lead vocals, rhythm guitar, keyboards, percussion, drums on "Why Can't You Be"
Tony Fredianelli – lead guitar, backing vocals, keyboards
Brad Hargreaves – drums, percussion, pianoAdditional PersonnelJon Evans – bass guitar except on "Bonfire"
Arion Salazar – bass guitar on "Bonfire"
Herve Salters – keyboards on "Why Can't You Be"
Robyn Croomer – backing vocals
Cynthia Taylor – backing vocals
Minna Choi – backing vocals
Ben Stokes – drum programming on "Water Landing," synthesizer on "Can You Take Me"Production'
Sean Beresford – engineering
Tony Hoffer – engineering
Chris Lord-Alge – engineering
Vlado Meller – mastering

References

External links

Third Eye Blind albums
2009 albums